Ottavio Broglia or Otavio Brolia (died October 1647) was a Roman Catholic prelate who served as Bishop of Asti (1624–1647).

Biography
On 11 March 1624, Ottavio Broglia was appointed during the papacy of Pope Urban VIII as Bishop of Asti.
On 12 March 1624, he was consecrated bishop by Scipione Caffarelli-Borghese, Archpriest of the Basilica di San Pietro in Vaticano with Raffaele Inviziati, Bishop Emeritus of Cefalonia e Zante, and Vincenzo Landinelli, Bishop Emeritus of Albenga, serving as co-consecrators. 
He served as Bishop of Asti until his death in October 1647.

Episcopal succession
While bishop, he was the principal co-consecrator of:
Giacinto Cordella, Bishop of Venafro (1635);
Pietro Bellino, Bishop of Saluzzo (1636);
Francesco Bianchi (bishop), Bishop of Sapë (1636); and
Petras Parčevskis, Bishop of Smoleńsk (1636).

References

External links and additional sources
 (for Chronology of Bishops) 
 (for Chronology of Bishops) 

17th-century Italian Roman Catholic bishops
Bishops appointed by Pope Urban VIII
1647 deaths